Great Dalby railway station was a railway station serving the village of Great Dalby, Leicestershire on the Great Northern and London and North Western Joint Railway. It opened on 15 December 1879 and closed to regular traffic on 7 December 1953.

References

Disused railway stations in Leicestershire
Railway stations in Great Britain opened in 1879
Railway stations in Great Britain closed in 1953
Former Great Northern Railway stations
Former London and North Western Railway stations
1879 establishments in England
1953 disestablishments in England